James A. Sharp Jr. is a former mayor of the City of Flint, Michigan, and the second "strong" mayor under Flint's 1974 Charter.

Political
Sharp defeated James W. Rutherford at his attempt at a third term for Flint Mayor, effectively becoming the city's first popularly elected African American mayor; the city's first African American mayor Floyd J. McCree, who served between 1966 and 1968, had been selected by the Flint City Commission.  In 1984, Sharp was selected as alternate delegate to Democratic National Convention from Michigan  Sharp was defeated by Matthew S. Collier in 1987.

References

Michigan Democrats
Mayors of Flint, Michigan
Living people
Year of birth missing (living people)
African-American mayors in Michigan
20th-century American politicians
20th-century African-American politicians
21st-century African-American people